Epilogue  is a 1983 Soviet psychological drama film directed by Marlen Khutsiev. A screen adaptation of the story of   writer Yuri Pakhomov.

Plot 
Alexey Borisovich, a 75-year-old father from a small town in the south of Russia, comes to Moscow to visit his daughter. But the daughter went on a business trip. The elderly man meets his son-in-law, who had taken a leave to work on his thesis.

Two representatives of different generations and views on life spend several days together. Alexey Borisovich, a former military surgeon, while waiting for his daughter, spends time talking with his son-in-law Vladimir, occasionally meeting his old friends and walking around Moscow, where he spent his pre-war youth.

Cast 
 Andrey Myagkov as  Vladimir Shvyrkov
 Rostislav Plyatt as Alexey Borisovich
 Yuri Senkevich as cameo

Production 
For the role of Alexey Borisovich, director Khutsiev originally invited Leonid Obolensky. The film was shot in Moscow on Vernadsky Avenue, Koshtoyants Street and in the Olympic Village.

References

External links 
 
 Экранный образ времени оттепели (60–80-е годы)

Soviet drama films
1980s psychological drama films
Mosfilm films
Films directed by Marlen Khutsiev
Films based on Russian novels
Films set in Moscow
Films shot in Moscow
1983 films
1980s Russian-language films
1983 drama films